Lycodon sidiki is one of seven Sunda Shelf species of snakes in the family Colubridae. It is endemic to Aceh Province, Sumatra.

Etymology
The specific name sidiki is due to honor of Indonesian herpetologist, Irvan Sidik, to his contributions for the herpetology.

Description
The species can identified from other wolf snakes, by the absence of preocular scale and presence of keeled dorsal scales. Smaller snakes have bright orange-red venter and older snakes have creamy venter.

References

Further reading
 

sidiki
Endemic fauna of Indonesia
Reptiles of Indonesia
Fauna of Sumatra
Snakes of Asia
Reptiles described in 2017